Musica Florea is a Czech Baroque music ensemble in Prague, founded in 1992 by conductor and cellist Marek Štryncl.

Profile 

The group of young professionals with a common interest in the study and authentic performance of Baroque music engaged primarily in performances and recordings of Baroque era music, but its repertoire extends from the early Baroque through masterpieces from that era's culminating decades to music in the Classical style. It includes instrumental chamber music, vocal-instrumental works both sacred and secular, orchestral concertos, and monumental works in the genres of opera and oratorio. Playing on original instruments, supported by study of period sources and aesthetics, has become indispensable and at the same time a characteristic trait of the ensemble.

Musica Florea enjoyed soon its first notable success, including a performance and recording of Jan Dismas Zelenka's Missa Sanctissimae Trinitatis, which received an award from the music magazine Diapason in 1995. A recording of Johann Sebastian Bach's arias from cantatas and oratoria with Czech mezzo-soprano Magdalena Kožená received Czech music award Golden Harmony in 1997. For the time being, the most success of the ensemble was Cannes Classical Award for the recording of Zelenka's melodrama Sub olea pacis et palma virtutis in 2003. Both Zelenka's works are world premiere recordings.

Recordings (albums) 
 Jan Dismas Zelenka: Missa Santissimae Trinitatis, (1994), Studio Matouš
 Johann Sebastian Bach: Cantatas and Oratoria Arias (1997) 
 Jan Dismas Zelenka: Sub olea pacis et palma virtutis, (2001), Supraphon
 Vejvanovský: Vesperae Sancti Venceslai, 2002, Supraphon (with Boni Pueri)
 Jan Dismas Zelenka / František Ignác Antonín Tůma: Die Responsorien Zum Karfreitag / Sonatas In A Minor & E Minor / Sinfonia In B Major, 2005, Supraphon (with Boni Pueri)
 Tomášek / Voříšek: Missa Solemnis In B / Messa Con Graduale Et Offertorio (2010), Supraphon
 Jan Václav Hugo Voříšek / Antonín Rejcha: Symphonies, (2010), Arta Records

References

Musica Florea
Early music orchestras
Musical groups established in 1992
1992 establishments in Czechoslovakia